Oleksandr Tishchenko (born March 25, 1989) is a Ukrainian professional basketball player for Kharkivski Sokoly in the Ukrainian Basketball Superleague.

Early life

Club career
In October 2019, Tishchenko signed with Kharkivski Sokoly of the Ukrainian Basketball Superleague.

References

1989 births
Living people
Power forwards (basketball)
BC Kharkivski Sokoly players
Ukrainian men's basketball players
Basketball players from Kyiv